Büregkhangai is a sum (district) of Bulgan Province in northern Mongolia. In 2009, its population is 2,406.

References

Districts of Bulgan Province